Adimurai is a Tamil martial art originating in modern-day Kanyakumari, the southernmost region in India. It was traditionally practiced in the Kanyakumari district of modern-day Tamil Nadu as well as nearby areas in southeastern Kerala. Its preliminary empty-hand techniques are called Adithada and application of vital points are called Varma Adi, although these terms are sometimes interchangeably used to refer to the martial art itself. Adimurai is a portmanteau in the Tamil language where adi means "to hit or strike" and murai means method or procedure. In modern period it is used alongside other Tamil martial arts.

History 

Adithadi is a non-lethal version of Adimurai which was developed in the Tamilnadu region of ancient India. It saw most of its practice in the Chola and Pandya kingdoms, where preliminary empty hand techniques were used.

Practice 

Adimurai is traditionally practiced outdoors or in unroofed areas. It is mainly practiced by Thevar, Kallars, and Nadar of southern Tamil Nadu.

In pop culture 
Adimurai was depicted in the film Pattas (2020) starring Dhanush, directed by R. S. Durai Senthilkumar.

See also 

Angampora
Banshay
Bataireacht
Bōjutsu
Gatka
Jūkendō
Kalaripayattu
Kendo
Kenjutsu
Krabi–krabong
Kuttu Varisai
Mardani khel
Silambam
Silambam Asia
Tahtib
Thang-ta
Varma kalai
World Silambam Association
Silat
Kbachkun boraan

References 

Indian martial arts
Dravidian martial arts
Tamil martial arts
Kalarippayattu